Niggli is an Italian surname that may refer to 
Josefina Niggli (1910–1983), Mexican-born Anglo-American playwright and novelist 
Paul Niggli (1888–1953), Swiss crystallographer 
Dorsum Niggli, a wrinkle ridge on the Moon
Niggli Nunataks, is a group of glacial islands in Antarctica
Simone Niggli-Luder (born 1978), Swiss orienteering athlete 
Urs Niggli (born 1953), Swiss agronomist 

Italian-language surnames